A left posterior fascicular block (LPFB), also known as left posterior hemiblock (LPH), is a condition where the left posterior fascicle, which travels to the inferior and posterior portion of the left ventricle, does not conduct the electrical impulses from the atrioventricular node. The wave-front instead moves more quickly through the left anterior fascicle and right bundle branch, leading to a right axis deviation seen on the ECG.

Definition
The American Heart Association has defined a LPFB as:
 Frontal plane axis between 90° and 180° in adults
 rS pattern in leads I and aVL
 qR pattern in leads III and aVF
 QRS duration less than 120 ms

The broad nature of the posterior bundle as well as its dual blood supply makes isolated LPFB rare.

See also
 Left bundle branch block
 Left anterior fascicular block

References

Further reading

External links 

Cardiac arrhythmia